The Braille pattern dots-236 is a 6-dot braille cell with the middle left and both bottom dots raised, or an 8-dot braille cell with the upper-middle left and both lower-middle dots raised. It is represented by the Unicode code point U+2826, and in Braille ASCII with the number 8.

Unified Braille

In unified international braille, the braille pattern dots-236 is used to represent various punctuation, often coupled with Braille pattern dots-356 as an opening mark.

Table of unified braille values

Other braille

Plus dots 7 and 8

Related to Braille pattern dots-236 are Braille patterns 2367, 2368, and 23678, which are used in 8-dot braille systems, such as Gardner-Salinas and Luxembourgish Braille.

Related 8-dot kantenji patterns

In the Japanese kantenji braille, the standard 8-dot Braille patterns 378, 1378, 3478, and 13478 are the patterns related to Braille pattern dots-236, since the two additional dots of kantenji patterns 0236, 2367, and 02367 are placed above the base 6-dot cell, instead of below, as in standard 8-dot braille.

Kantenji using braille patterns 378, 1378, 3478, or 13478

This listing includes kantenji using Braille pattern dots-236 for all 6349 kanji found in JIS C 6226-1978.

  - 日

Variants and thematic compounds

  -  selector 4 + 日  =  旦
  -  selector 5 + 日  =  亘
  -  日 + selector 1  =  白
  -  日 + selector 4  =  旧
  -  日 + selector 6  =  曰

Compounds of 日

  -  龸 + 日  =  冥
  -  し/巿 + 龸 + 日  =  幎
  -  日 + 龸 + 日  =  暝
  -  心 + 龸 + 日  =  榠
  -  に/氵 + 龸 + 日  =  溟
  -  め/目 + 龸 + 日  =  瞑
  -  む/車 + 龸 + 日  =  螟
  -  よ/广 + 日  =  厚
  -  れ/口 + 日  =  唱
  -  宿 + 日  =  宴
  -  し/巿 + 日  =  幟
  -  り/分 + 日  =  昌
  -  な/亻 + り/分 + 日  =  倡
  -  ふ/女 + り/分 + 日  =  娼
  -  き/木 + り/分 + 日  =  椙
  -  け/犬 + り/分 + 日  =  猖
  -  心 + り/分 + 日  =  菖
  -  け/犬 + 日  =  春
  -  る/忄 + け/犬 + 日  =  惷
  -  心 + け/犬 + 日  =  椿
  -  せ/食 + け/犬 + 日  =  鰆
  -  や/疒 + 日  =  智
  -  こ/子 + 日  =  暦
  -  く/艹 + 日  =  暮
  -  に/氵 + 日  =  潮
  -  ち/竹 + 日  =  簡
  -  い/糹/#2 + 日  =  織
  -  と/戸 + 日  =  者
  -  ほ/方 + 日  =  屠
  -  日 + 日  =  暑
  -  火 + 日  =  煮
  -  ゐ/幺 + 日  =  緒
  -  す/発 + 日  =  署
  -  心 + す/発 + 日  =  薯
  -  ゑ/訁 + 日  =  諸
  -  心 + ゑ/訁 + 日  =  藷
  -  を/貝 + 日  =  賭
  -  な/亻 + と/戸 + 日  =  偖
  -  け/犬 + と/戸 + 日  =  奢
  -  心 + と/戸 + 日  =  楮
  -  に/氵 + と/戸 + 日  =  渚
  -  氷/氵 + と/戸 + 日  =  瀦
  -  め/目 + と/戸 + 日  =  睹
  -  か/金 + と/戸 + 日  =  赭
  -  も/門 + と/戸 + 日  =  闍
  -  み/耳 + 日  =  職
  -  え/訁 + 日  =  識
  -  も/門 + 日  =  間
  -  つ/土 + も/門 + 日  =  墹
  -  火 + も/門 + 日  =  燗
  -  ま/石 + 日  =  音
  -  日 + ま/石  =  暗
  -  し/巿 + ま/石 + 日  =  黯
  -  お/頁 + 日  =  題
  -  の/禾 + 日  =  香
  -  す/発 + の/禾 + 日  =  馥
  -  み/耳 + の/禾 + 日  =  馨
  -  日 + と/戸  =  卓
  -  な/亻 + 日 + と/戸  =  倬
  -  れ/口 + 日 + と/戸  =  啅
  -  て/扌 + 日 + と/戸  =  掉
  -  き/木 + 日 + と/戸  =  棹
  -  い/糹/#2 + 日 + と/戸  =  綽
  -  す/発 + 日 + と/戸  =  罩
  -  日 + う/宀/#3  =  影
  -  日 + ろ/十  =  早
  -  氷/氵 + 日 + ろ/十  =  覃
  -  に/氵 + 日 + ろ/十  =  潭
  -  ち/竹 + 日 + ろ/十  =  簟
  -  心 + 日 + ろ/十  =  蕈
  -  え/訁 + 日 + ろ/十  =  譚
  -  か/金 + 日 + ろ/十  =  鐔
  -  日 + す/発  =  旬
  -  ゆ/彳 + 日 + す/発  =  徇
  -  る/忄 + 日 + す/発  =  恂
  -  に/氵 + 日 + す/発  =  洵
  -  い/糹/#2 + 日 + す/発  =  絢
  -  心 + 日 + す/発  =  荀
  -  え/訁 + 日 + す/発  =  詢
  -  日 + 比  =  昆
  -  き/木 + 日 + 比  =  棍
  -  火 + 日 + 比  =  焜
  -  ち/竹 + 日 + 比  =  箟
  -  心 + 日 + 比  =  菎
  -  せ/食 + 日 + 比  =  鯤
  -  日 + く/艹  =  昇
  -  日 + ら/月  =  明
  -  日 + ⺼  =  盟
  -  く/艹 + 日 + ら/月  =  萌
  -  日 + ん/止  =  昏
  -  き/木 + 日 + ん/止  =  棔
  -  日 + 数  =  易
  -  ぬ/力 + 日 + 数  =  剔
  -  む/車 + 日 + 数  =  蜴
  -  ね/示 + 日 + 数  =  裼
  -  せ/食 + 日 + 数  =  鯣
  -  日 + ね/示  =  昔
  -  く/艹 + 日 + ね/示  =  藉
  -  せ/食 + 日 + ね/示  =  醋
  -  日 + い/糹/#2  =  星
  -  る/忄 + 日 + い/糹/#2  =  惺
  -  け/犬 + 日 + い/糹/#2  =  猩
  -  ⺼ + 日 + い/糹/#2  =  腥
  -  せ/食 + 日 + い/糹/#2  =  醒
  -  日 + お/頁  =  映
  -  日 + さ/阝  =  昨
  -  日 + ぬ/力  =  昭
  -  日 + 火  =  照
  -  日 + よ/广  =  是
  -  う/宀/#3 + 日 + よ/广  =  寔
  -  せ/食 + 日 + よ/广  =  醍
  -  日 + し/巿  =  時
  -  つ/土 + 日 + し/巿  =  塒
  -  く/艹 + 日 + し/巿  =  蒔
  -  日 + ひ/辶  =  晋
  -  日 + 日 + ひ/辶  =  晉
  -  い/糹/#2 + 日 + ひ/辶  =  縉
  -  日 + に/氵  =  晒
  -  日 + は/辶  =  晦
  -  日 + 宿  =  晩
  -  日 + れ/口  =  景
  -  る/忄 + 日 + れ/口  =  憬
  -  日 + せ/食  =  晴
  -  日 + 龸  =  晶
  -  き/木 + 日 + 龸  =  橸
  -  日 + つ/土  =  暁
  -  日 + 日 + つ/土  =  曉
  -  日 + の/禾  =  暇
  -  日 + 仁/亻  =  暖
  -  日 + む/車  =  暫
  -  日 + こ/子  =  暴
  -  日 + 日 + こ/子  =  曝
  -  に/氵 + 日 + こ/子  =  瀑
  -  日 + ち/竹  =  曇
  -  つ/土 + 日 + ち/竹  =  壜
  -  ん/止 + 日 + ち/竹  =  罎
  -  日 + ほ/方  =  曙
  -  日 + や/疒  =  曜
  -  日 + ぬ/力 + そ/馬  =  勗
  -  日 + 宿 + ひ/辶  =  匙
  -  つ/土 + 宿 + 日  =  堵
  -  て/扌 + 宿 + 日  =  搨
  -  日 + 数 + お/頁  =  旭
  -  日 + selector 4 + か/金  =  旱
  -  日 + 龸 + selector 3  =  旻
  -  日 + 宿 + さ/阝  =  昂
  -  日 + 仁/亻 + よ/广  =  昃
  -  日 + selector 1 + け/犬  =  昊
  -  日 + selector 4 + 数  =  昜
  -  日 + き/木 + selector 4  =  昧
  -  日 + さ/阝 + う/宀/#3  =  昴
  -  日 + と/戸 + 仁/亻  =  昵
  -  日 + 宿 + よ/广  =  昿
  -  日 + 数 + 宿  =  晁
  -  日 + 龸 + selector 2  =  晃
  -  日 + 宿 + 龸  =  晄
  -  日 + う/宀/#3 + ふ/女  =  晏
  -  日 + め/目 + し/巿  =  晞
  -  日 + せ/食 + ひ/辶  =  晟
  -  日 + て/扌 + を/貝  =  晢
  -  日 + ら/月 + れ/口  =  晤
  -  日 + こ/子 + く/艹  =  晧
  -  日 + selector 4 + ろ/十  =  晨
  -  日 + 宿 + お/頁  =  晰
  -  日 + selector 4 + 火  =  暃
  -  日 + 宿 + む/車  =  暈
  -  日 + 龸 + む/車  =  暉
  -  日 + く/艹 + お/頁  =  暎
  -  日 + 宿 + 数  =  暘
  -  日 + 龸 + ろ/十  =  暸
  -  日 + ひ/辶 + ひ/辶  =  暹
  -  日 + selector 3 + は/辶  =  暼
  -  日 + 宿 + 氷/氵  =  暾
  -  日 + く/艹 + か/金  =  曄
  -  日 + 龸 + selector 1  =  曖
  -  日 + 宿 + そ/馬  =  曚
  -  日 + よ/广 + こ/子  =  曠
  -  日 + そ/馬 + 囗  =  曦
  -  日 + 宿 + み/耳  =  曩
  -  日 + 宿 + き/木  =  杲
  -  き/木 + 龸 + 日  =  杳
  -  氷/氵 + 宿 + 日  =  汨
  -  火 + 宿 + 日  =  熾
  -  ち/竹 + 宿 + 日  =  簪
  -  ふ/女 + 宿 + 日  =  艪
  -  ね/示 + 宿 + 日  =  衵
  -  え/訁 + 龸 + 日  =  譖

Compounds of 旦

  -  な/亻 + 日  =  但
  -  て/扌 + 日  =  担
  -  て/扌 + て/扌 + 日  =  擔
  -  た/⽥ + 日  =  昼
  -  た/⽥ + た/⽥ + 日  =  晝
  -  ⺼ + 日  =  胆
  -  ⺼ + ⺼ + 日  =  膽
  -  ゆ/彳 + 日  =  得
  -  日 + り/分  =  量
  -  き/木 + 日  =  査
  -  に/氵 + き/木 + 日  =  渣
  -  つ/土 + selector 4 + 日  =  坦
  -  ふ/女 + selector 4 + 日  =  妲
  -  る/忄 + selector 4 + 日  =  怛
  -  や/疒 + selector 4 + 日  =  疸
  -  ね/示 + selector 4 + 日  =  袒
  -  と/戸 + selector 4 + 日  =  靼
  -  る/忄 + 宿 + 日  =  憺
  -  日 + や/疒 + 仁/亻  =  曁
  -  き/木 + う/宀/#3 + 日  =  檐
  -  き/木 + 宿 + 日  =  櫓
  -  に/氵 + 宿 + 日  =  澹
  -  め/目 + 宿 + 日  =  瞻
  -  ち/竹 + 龸 + 日  =  簷
  -  む/車 + 宿 + 日  =  蟾
  -  え/訁 + 宿 + 日  =  譫
  -  を/貝 + 宿 + 日  =  贍

Compounds of 亘

  -  つ/土 + 日  =  垣
  -  う/宀/#3 + 日  =  宣
  -  れ/口 + う/宀/#3 + 日  =  喧
  -  る/忄 + う/宀/#3 + 日  =  愃
  -  日 + う/宀/#3 + 日  =  暄
  -  心 + う/宀/#3 + 日  =  萱
  -  え/訁 + う/宀/#3 + 日  =  諠
  -  る/忄 + 日  =  恒
  -  る/忄 + る/忄 + 日  =  恆
  -  き/木 + selector 5 + 日  =  桓

Compounds of 白

  -  仁/亻 + 日  =  伯
  -  心 + 日  =  柏
  -  氷/氵 + 日  =  泊
  -  ち/竹 + 氷/氵 + 日  =  箔
  -  ふ/女 + 日  =  舶
  -  ひ/辶 + 日  =  迫
  -  ひ/辶 + 日 + へ/⺩  =  遑
  -  せ/食 + 日  =  魯
  -  日 + て/扌  =  拍
  -  日 + ゐ/幺  =  楽
  -  日 + 日 + ゐ/幺  =  樂
  -  て/扌 + 日 + ゐ/幺  =  擽
  -  火 + 日 + ゐ/幺  =  爍
  -  ま/石 + 日 + ゐ/幺  =  礫
  -  む/車 + 日 + ゐ/幺  =  轢
  -  か/金 + 日 + ゐ/幺  =  鑠
  -  心 + 日 + ゐ/幺  =  檪
  -  日 + 氷/氵  =  泉
  -  き/木 + 日 + 氷/氵  =  楾
  -  に/氵 + 日 + 氷/氵  =  湶
  -  ⺼ + 日 + 氷/氵  =  腺
  -  日 + 氷/氵 + selector 4  =  昶
  -  日 + た/⽥  =  畠
  -  日 + も/門  =  的
  -  日 + へ/⺩  =  皇
  -  む/車 + 日 + へ/⺩  =  凰
  -  ゆ/彳 + 日 + へ/⺩  =  徨
  -  る/忄 + 日 + へ/⺩  =  惶
  -  に/氵 + 日 + へ/⺩  =  湟
  -  火 + 日 + へ/⺩  =  煌
  -  ち/竹 + 日 + へ/⺩  =  篁
  -  か/金 + 日 + へ/⺩  =  鍠
  -  さ/阝 + 日 + へ/⺩  =  隍
  -  せ/食 + 日 + へ/⺩  =  鰉
  -  日 + へ/⺩ + selector 1  =  旺
  -  比 + 日  =  皆
  -  さ/阝 + 日  =  階
  -  な/亻 + 比 + 日  =  偕
  -  て/扌 + 比 + 日  =  揩
  -  き/木 + 比 + 日  =  楷
  -  え/訁 + 比 + 日  =  諧
  -  む/車 + 日  =  習
  -  る/忄 + む/車 + 日  =  慴
  -  て/扌 + む/車 + 日  =  摺
  -  ね/示 + む/車 + 日  =  褶
  -  そ/馬 + 日  =  貌
  -  く/艹 + そ/馬 + 日  =  藐
  -  し/巿 + 日 + selector 1  =  帛
  -  る/忄 + 日 + selector 1  =  怕
  -  き/木 + 日 + selector 1  =  槹
  -  け/犬 + 日 + selector 1  =  狛
  -  へ/⺩ + 日 + selector 1  =  珀
  -  ひ/辶 + 日 + selector 1  =  皀
  -  宿 + 日 + selector 1  =  皃
  -  や/疒 + 日 + selector 1  =  皚
  -  の/禾 + 日 + selector 1  =  粕
  -  く/艹 + 日 + selector 1  =  葩
  -  ね/示 + 日 + selector 1  =  袙
  -  や/疒 + う/宀/#3 + 日  =  岶
  -  心 + 宿 + 日  =  櫟
  -  日 + は/辶 + ん/止  =  皈
  -  日 + き/木 + selector 6  =  皋
  -  日 + 龸 + ち/竹  =  皎
  -  日 + 宿 + ろ/十  =  皐
  -  日 + 宿 + こ/子  =  皓
  -  日 + う/宀/#3 + 宿  =  皖
  -  日 + き/木 + お/頁  =  皙
  -  日 + お/頁 + に/氵  =  魄

Compounds of 旧

  -  日 + 日 + selector 4  =  舊

Compounds of 曰

  -  日 + な/亻  =  更
  -  れ/口 + 日 + な/亻  =  哽
  -  や/疒 + 日 + な/亻  =  峺
  -  心 + 日 + な/亻  =  梗
  -  の/禾 + 日 + な/亻  =  粳
  -  日 + め/目  =  冒
  -  へ/⺩ + 日 + め/目  =  瑁
  -  日 + ふ/女  =  書
  -  日 + け/犬  =  替
  -  な/亻 + 日 + け/犬  =  僣
  -  仁/亻 + 日 + け/犬  =  僭
  -  え/訁 + 日 + け/犬  =  譛
  -  日 + ゑ/訁  =  最
  -  き/木 + 日 + ゑ/訁  =  樶
  -  に/氵 + 日 + selector 6  =  沓
  -  日 + 宿 + め/目  =  冐
  -  日 + ぬ/力 + 宿  =  冕

Other compounds

  -  ね/示 + 日  =  衿
  -  か/金 + 日  =  鈴
  -  日 + か/金  =  年
  -  日 + そ/馬  =  秒
  -  日 + を/貝  =  頃
  -  に/氵 + 日 + を/貝  =  潁
  -  め/目 + 日  =  瞼
  -  さ/阝 + 日 + く/艹  =  陞
  -  か/金 + う/宀/#3 + 日  =  瓰

Notes

Braille patterns